"What Happened and What's Going On" is the ninth episode and mid-season premiere of the fifth season of the post-apocalyptic horror television series The Walking Dead, which aired on AMC on February 8, 2015. It marks Chad L. Coleman's final appearance as series regular Tyreese. It also features several appearances from deceased characters in Tyreese's hallucinations. The episode was written by series showrunner Scott M. Gimple and directed by Greg Nicotero.

The narrative takes place in Richmond, Virginia, marking the first time the series is not set in Georgia. It takes place 17 days after Beth Greene's (Emily Kinney) death as the group finds Noah's walled community known as "Shirewilt Estates", a nod to a similar location in the comic book series. The episode primarily focuses on Tyreese, his struggle accepting death, and the guilt he faces over the losses of other group members due to actions he believes he could have done differently. The opening montage intercuts among a funeral that appears to be Beth's and previous sanctuaries: Woodbury, the prison, and Shirewilt. The ending reveals the funeral is Tyreese's. Several deceased characters return as hallucinations such as Martin (Chris Coy), Bob Stookey (Lawrence Gilliard Jr.), The Governor (David Morrissey), Lizzie and Mika Samuels (Brighton Sharbino and Kyla Kenedy), and Beth Greene. This episode also includes an acoustic cover version of Jimmy Cliff's "Struggling Man" sung by Beth.

The episode was lauded by television commentators, who praised Coleman's performance, Nicotero's direction, and Gimple's script. Others noted Tyreese's death as shocking and well-handled.

Plot
The group is still reeling from the tragedy of Beth's death at Grady Memorial Hospital. They decide that the best way to honor her is to complete Beth's intended mission of reuniting Noah with his family. The entire group makes the 530-mile journey to "Shirewilt Estates", a walled community outside of Richmond, Virginia, leaving Georgia behind. Rick, Michonne, Tyreese, Glenn, and Noah decide to scout ahead and visit the compound first, while the others remain behind to be safe. In the car, Tyreese tells Noah and the others about his father who always used to tell him and Sasha that, as citizens of the world, they should listen to the news and never change the channel or turn it off if it's something horrific, as they should always know about the atrocities that take place so they can be prepared and have their eyes open. Upon arrival, however, they discover the community has been overrun and everybody inside it killed. The words, "Wolves not far", are spray-painted on a brick wall. Noah breaks down, and Tyreese stays behind to comfort him as Rick, Michonne, and Glenn scout for supplies.

Tyreese tells Noah that he wanted to give in and die when Karen was killed, but that he kept on fighting, and decided to live and, as a result, he was able to protect Judith when she needed him. Noah stands and sprints to his family's home, with Tyreese in pursuit. They arrive and find Noah's family dead. Tyreese explores the house while Noah sits by his mother's corpse and apologizes for not returning home sooner. While focused on pictures of Noah's family, Tyreese is bitten by Noah's reanimated brother, whom Noah quickly dispatches with a model jet. Noah leaves immediately to retrieve Rick and the others. Tyreese suffers severe blood loss and begins to hallucinate about news stories on the radio as well as visits by Martin, Bob, The Governor, and Lizzie & Mika, who discuss his actions throughout his time with the group. Over the radio, Tyreese begins to hear a news story about a group of people traveling up the East Coast and slaughtering innocent people in gruesome ways. He also struggles internally with his recent decisions and "speaks" with his hallucinations. Bob and the girls try to comfort and reassure him that he did the right thing, and that death is much better than being alive, but The Governor and Martin antagonize him for not being able to do what they feel needed to be done. In between his discussions Tyreese is bitten again in a skirmish with another walker, further worsening his already bleak situation.

Elsewhere, Michonne continues to express a desire to settle in one place and to fortify the town, but Rick argues that the town is indefensible, showing how part of its defensive wall had apparently been toppled by a large vehicle. They notice walkers that have been severed in half, but do not act upon it any further. Michonne then recommends going to Washington, D.C., because, although Eugene lied about a cure, D.C. may still have resources to improve their chances for survival. Rick comes around and agrees to make the 100-mile journey to Washington, which pleases Michonne. They are then alerted by Noah yelling. They find him about to be bitten by walkers, but manage to save him in time. Noah informs the others about Tyreese's condition. Tyreese listens to Beth singing, before being further antagonized by The Governor. An impassioned Tyreese confronts The Governor with his convictions, before collapsing while Lizzie holds his hand; in reality this is Rick stretching his arm so Michonne can amputate it, and they suffer a grueling challenge in escaping the estate with a seriously wounded Tyreese. They fight their way through waves of walkers and pass a truck filled with walkers that have had their arms and legs cut off and the letter W carved into their foreheads. During the ride back, Tyreese is comforted by visions of Bob, Beth, and the girls. He tells Bob to turn off the radio, effectively deciding that he wants to let go and join them in death. He passes away and is put down by Michonne, so that he does not reanimate. The remaining survivors then attend his funeral, which Gabriel presides over. A visibly traumatized Sasha is seen struggling to stand throughout the service while Rick personally buries him and leaves his cap on his cross.

Production

"What Happened and What's Going On" was written by executive producer and showrunner Gimple and directed by executive producer and special make-up effects supervisor Nicotero. The episode features several guest appearances by actors whose characters were killed off in previous episodes, including Kinney as Beth, Gilliard Jr. as Bob, Morrissey as The Governor, Sharbino as Lizzie, Kenedy as Mika, and Coy as Martin. Lincoln, in his natural accent, provided the voice of the radio broadcaster.

This episode marks Chad L. Coleman's final appearance as a series regular, as Tyreese was killed off in the episode. On the decision to kill Tyreese, Gimple explained:

"There is never a right time; this was the time the story seemed to dictate. Not just for this episode but for the story moving forward. The cumulative effect of the last eight episodes and then this ninth episode, moving into next few, it's all a cumulative effect of who these people are and the circumstances they eventually find themselves in. It's weird to say, "This was the time" because it's such a painful thing. It just seemed to be what the story dictated."

The episode features a homage to the comic book series as Noah's community of 20 people is known as "Shirewilt Estates". The name comes from the prominent location, "Wiltshire Estates" in "Miles Behind Us".

Reception

Upon airing, the episode was watched by 15.64 million American viewers with an 18-49 rating of 8.0, an increase in viewership from the previous episode which had 14.81 million viewers and an 18-49 rating of 7.6.

In Australia, it received 79,000 viewers, making it the most-watched broadcast on pay television that night. The British broadcast was the most-watched on the network that month, with 1.16 million viewers.

Critical reception
The episode received critical acclaim, with many praising the direction of Nicotero, the script of Gimple and the performance by Coleman. On Rotten Tomatoes, it holds a 100% with an average rating of 8.08 out of 10, based on 27 reviews. The critics' consensus reads: A visually impressive episode of The Walking Dead, "What Happened and What's Going On" artfully portrays the psychology of the characters, rather than focusing on its shocking moments. It is currently the highest rated episode of the show on the website.

Writing for Forbes, Erik Kain considered it to be the "best episode in years". He said, "It’s all of this attention to detail, whether just a terrific shot of the train tracks or a moment of explosive gore, that make this such a remarkable and memorable episode—an impressive cinematic achievement, and a tremendous hour of television.

IGN's Matt Fowler praised the episode's opening montage, which was revealed as foreshadowing to the end of the episode in a plot twist that the funeral taking place was Tyreese's and not Beth's, calling it a "great little trick". He praised the performance of Coleman, and the direction of Nicotero declaring it "gorgeously directed", the theme of hopelessness within the episode and the hallucinations of the deceased characters. Overall, he gave the episode a 9.0/10.

References

External links

"What Happened and What's Going On" at AMC

2015 American television episodes
The Walking Dead (season 5) episodes